Irwin is an unincorporated community in Merced County, California, United States. For census purposes, Irwin is aggregated with nearby communities in the census-designated place Hilmar-Irwin, California.

A post office operated at Irwin from 1911 to 1958. The name honors W.A. Irwin, founder of the town.

References 

Unincorporated communities in California
Unincorporated communities in Merced County, California